Wraysbury and Hythe End Gravel Pits is a  biological Site of Special Scientific Interest in Wraysbury in Berkshire. It is part of South West London Waterbodies Ramsar site and Special Protection Area.

The site features four former gravel pits and is within the floodplains of the River Thames and the Colne Brook. It is important for the number of bird species it features.

Fauna

The Park has the following animals</ref>

Birds

Invertebrates

Platycnemis pennipes
Oulimnius major
Leptocerus lusitanius

Flora

The site has the following Flora:

Trees

Rhamnus catharticus
Salix fragilis

Plants

Phragmites australis
Carex acutiformis
Carex riparia
Potamogeton pusillus
Typha latifolia
Bidens tripartita
Zannichellia palustris
Lathyrus nissolia
Carex spicata

References

Sites of Special Scientific Interest in Berkshire